A Teacher of Singing is a 1972 Soviet comedy film directed by Naum Birman.

Plot 
The film tells about the fun and witty Efrem Nikolayevich Solomatin, who wants to open a music school in which he will cultivate in his students a love not only for music, but also for life and the world around him.

Cast 
 Andrei Popov as The teacher of singing
 Irina Alfyorova as The teacher's daughter
 Igor Bogdanov
 Nikolay Boyarskiy as Cameo
 Aleksandr Demyanenko
 Yevgeny Yevstigneev		
 Lyudmila Ivanova
 Konstantin Koshkin
 Yevgeniya Sabelnikova
 Natalya Sayko

References

External links 
 

1972 films
1970s Russian-language films
Soviet comedy films
1972 comedy films